Sam Groth and Chris Guccione were the defending champions, but did not participate.
Gero Kretschmer and Alexander Satschko won the title, defeating Saketh Myneni and Divij Sharan in the final, 6–1, 3–6, [10–2].

Seeds

Draw

References
 Main Draw

Gemdale ATP Challenger China International Shenzhen - Doubles
Pingshan Open